Tube Lines Limited, initially known as 'Infraco JNP' (an amalgamation of infrastructure and company), is an asset-management company responsible for the maintenance, renewal and upgrade of the infrastructure, including track, trains, signals, civils work and stations, of three London Underground lines.

Originally a consortium of private companies, Tube Lines was one of two infrastructure companies (the other being Metronet) who entered into a public-private partnership (PPP) with London Underground in 2003.

The company has been a wholly owned subsidiary of Transport for London (TfL) since May 2010, and has now been rebranded as "London Underground".

History
In the late 1990s, the Labour government proposed a Public Private Partnership (PPP) to reverse years of underinvestment in London Underground. The Tube trains themselves would be operated by the public sector and the infrastructure (track, trains, tunnels, signals, and stations) would be leased to private firms for 30 years to allow improvements to be made.

Tube Lines was founded by a consortium of Amey plc (a subsidiary of Grupo Ferrovial), Bechtel and Jarvis plc in 2000 to bid for the PPP contract. In 2005, Jarvis sold its stake to fellow shareholder Amey for £147million. Tube Lines planned to subcontract work to achieve the lowest possible cost, with Metronet (the other PPP consortium) awarding contracts directly to its shareholders.

Formation of the PPP 
Following a two-year bidding process, Metronet and Tube Lines were selected as the preferred consortiums in May 2001.

In April 2003, Tube Lines began to maintain, upgrade and renewal London Underground infrastructure as part of the PPP. Tube Lines had been the successful bidder for the 30 year JNP (tube) lines contract, serving the Jubilee, Northern and Piccadilly lines. A second PPP consortium, Metronet, held the other two contracts for the 9 remaining London Underground lines.

Both Metronet and Tube Lines were colloquially referred to as "infracos". Contracts were worth around £17billion over the 30-year period, with each contract receiving around £660million each month from the Government, with reductions if targets are not met.

Commitments under the PPP 

Under the terms of the PPP contracts, Tube Lines agreed to maintain London Underground infrastructure (track, trains, tunnels, signals, and stations) to the standards and performance levels set in the contract. Tube Lines committed to delivering substantial improvements to the network by refurbishing, upgrading and renewing track, trains, tunnels, signals and stations. To encourage high reliability, deductions suffered for poor performance were set at twice the rate of increase in revenue for improved performance.

At a cost of £4.4billion, Tube Lines promised substantial investment during the first 7.5years of the contract (2003 to 2010):

 100 stations (including lifts and escalators) modernised or refurbished
  of track replaced
 Upgrade and refurbishment of tunnels, bridges, embankments, track drainage and other civil structures
 Reconstruction and expansion of Wembley Park station
 Improvements to existing trains to improve reliability and reduce delays
 Additional carriage added to 1996 Stock trains to increase capacity on the Jubilee line 
 New signalling system for the Jubilee and Northern lines
 93 new Piccadilly line trains, which would enter service by 2014 (cancelled following the collapse of the PPP)

Performance and criticism 
In June 2004, the National Audit Office criticised the complexity of the PPP deals, noting they offered "the prospect, but not the certainty" of improvements. In March 2005, the House of Commons Transport Select Committee noted that "Availability is the most important factor for Tube travellers. All the infracos needed to do to meet their availability benchmarks was to perform only a little worse than in the past. On most lines, they did not even manage that." In March 2005, the House of Commons Public Accounts Committee, charged with ensuring value for money in public spending, published a report concluding that it was "impossible to determine" whether the PPP was better value than a publicly run investment programme.

By November 2006, Metronet, the other PPP consortium, was £750million over budget, whereas Tube Lines was delivering projects on time and on budget. Chief Executive of Tube Lines, Terry Morgan, noted the use of competitive procurement to minimise costs, unlike the closed shop approach of Metronet. In July 2007, Metronet collapsed and was placed into administration. Metronet was subsequently taken over by TfL in 2008.

By 2008, Tube Lines was negotiating the next part of the 30-year contract. It noted that all of its major projects had been delivered on time (unlike the Metronet consortium), and that Underground lines it managed were now significantly more reliable - up to 70% more reliable on the Piccadilly line, for example.

In 2009, Tube Lines had encountered a funding shortfall for its upgrades and requested that TfL provide an additional £1.75billion to cover the shortfall. TfL refused, and referred the matter to the PPP arbiter, who stated that £400million should be provided. Tube Lines was also criticised over the number of weekend and late night closures required to upgrade the Jubilee line signalling system.

Takeover by TfL 
On 7 May 2010, Transport for London agreed to buy out Bechtel and Amey (Ferrovial), the shareholders of Tube Lines for £310million, formally ending the PPP. Commentators blamed the complex and "onerous" contracts for its failure. Combined with the takeover of Metronet, this meant that all maintenance was thereafter managed in-house, despite TfL using a large number of private suppliers and contractors. Some of the improvements promised by Tube Lines were subsequently delivered (such as new signalling on the Northern line), while other improvements were subsequently cancelled or delayed.

Amey continued to provide TfL with management and maintenance services for the Jubilee, Northern and Piccadilly lines until the end of 2017, when London Underground Limited took over from Amey. Tube Lines itself now been rebranded as "London Underground".

See also 

 History of the London Underground
 Metronet, the other PPP consortium responsible for London Underground infrastructure

References

External links
 

London Underground infrastructure
Public–private partnership projects in the United Kingdom